Gerald Augustine John Ryan (August 23, 1923 – June 4, 1985) was an American prelate of the Catholic Church who served as Auxiliary bishop of the Diocese of Rockville Centre, New York from 1977 to 1985.

Biography
Born in Brooklyn, New York, Ryan was ordained a priest for the Roman Catholic Diocese of Brooklyn on June 3, 1950.

On February 28, 1977, Ryan was named titular bishop of Munatiania and auxiliary bishop of the Roman Catholic Diocese of Rockville Centre and was consecrated on May 9, 1977.

Bishop Ryan died while still in office.

Notes

 

}

1923 births
1985 deaths
People from Brooklyn
20th-century American Roman Catholic titular bishops
Catholics from New York (state)